The  or  took place in 1564, when Matsudaira Motoyasu (later renamed Tokugawa Ieyasu), sought to destroy the growing threat of the Ikkō-ikki, a league of monks, samurai, and peasants who were strongly against samurai rule.

Background
Tensions between warriors and the Ikki had been escalating in Mikawa as the Ikki resisted samurai efforts to tax their temples. Fighting broke out in 1563 when Suganuma Sada, a Matsudaira retainer entered the Jōgū-ji temple in Okazaki, and confiscated its rice to feed his own men. In retaliation the monks attacked Suganuma's castle and retrieved the rice back to Jōgū-ji where they barricaded themselves. When Motoyasu sent messengers to their temple to investigate the disorder they were executed. In another incident, Ikki samurai attacked a merchant in the temple town of Honshō-ji. Motoyasu launched a raid against the temple but was defeated.

Battle

On January 15, 1564. Motoyasu had decided to concentrate his forces in eliminating the Ikki from Mikawa and had sought the help of warrior monks from the temple of Daiju-ji with whom he enjoyed good relations. In the Ikki ranks were some of Motoyasu's vassals, like Honda Masanobu and Natsume Yoshinobu, who had turned over to the Ikki rebellion on religious sympathy.

The battle was fierce and Motoyasu took the field personally, issuing challenges to enemy samurai and fighting in the front line where he received several bullets that pierced his armour but failed to wound him.

Aftermath
Motoyasu's brave conduct in the battle convinced many of the samurai turncoats in the Ikki to switch sides and the Ikki were defeated. Nevertheless, the battle did not spell the end of the Ikki in Mikawa, Motoyasu continued his campaign to pacify the Mikawa province from the Ikki.

See also 
Battle of Azukizaka (1542)

References

Bibliography 
Turnbull, Stephen. (1996). 'Samurai warfare'. CASSEL IMPRINT.
Turnbull, Stephen. (2003). 'Japanese Warrior Monks AD 949-1603'. Oxford: Osprey Publishing.
Turnbull, Stephen. (2008). 'Samurai Armies 1467–1649'. Oxford: Osprey Publishing.
Turnbull, Stephen. (2010). 'Samurai Armies 1467–1649'. Oxford: Osprey Publishing.

1564 in Japan
Azukizaka 1564
Azukizaka (1564)
Ikkō-ikki